Malte Tobias Moos (born 2 February 1996) is a German footballer who plays as a defender for Stuttgarter Kickers.

References

External links
 
 Malte Moos at FuPa
 

German footballers
Association football defenders
1. FSV Mainz 05 II players
Wormatia Worms players
Stuttgarter Kickers players
3. Liga players
Regionalliga players
1996 births
Living people